Mark Dean Schwab (December 16, 1968 – July 1, 2008) was an American murderer and child rapist. He was convicted of the April 18, 1991 rape and murder of 11-year-old Junny Rios-Martinez, Jr. and imprisoned at Raiford Prison in Florida.  Schwab was convicted of the crime in 1992 and sentenced to death by lethal injection. In addition, he received two life sentences.

The crimes and arrest
Schwab was released from prison on March 4, 1991, after serving three years of an eight-year sentence for the aggravated rape of a 13-year-old boy committed in 1987.  The rest of his sentence was commuted and he was placed on 15 years of probation.

A month later, Cocoa resident Junny Rios-Martinez, Jr. went missing.  Schwab had seen Junny's picture in the March 21, 1991 edition of Florida Today.  He became friendly with the boy and his family, introducing himself as an associate of Malcom Denemark from that newspaper. After getting to know Junny, Schwab exploited his interest in surfing by saying he had left Florida Today for a job at a surfing magazine. On April 18, 1991, Junny was spotted getting into a U-Haul truck.

On April 20, 1991, Schwab called his aunt in Ohio, claiming a man named "Donald" forced him to kidnap and rape Junny, under threat of killing Junny's mother, Vicki.  The next day, police tapped a phone call with Schwab's aunt's permission, and determined Schwab's location.  Schwab was arrested, and led police to Junny's dead body, found in Canaveral Groves, a rural area of Brevard County, Florida in a footlocker that was "nearly shut" covered in palm fronds, debris, and wrapped in rope.

Trial
On May 15, 1991, Schwab appeared in a state court in Brevard County, pleading not guilty to charges of first-degree murder, kidnapping a child under age 13 and sexual assault of a child under age 13. Prosecutors sought the death penalty.  Schwab waived his right to a jury trial, and was convicted on May 22, 1992.  At trial, witnesses had testified that Schwab was raped at gunpoint by a friend's father as a child. On July 1, 1992, he was sentenced to death for the murder, and given two life sentences for the kidnapping and sexual battery of a child under the age of 13. In addition, his probation was revoked on the previous rape conviction, and he was re-sentenced to an additional life sentence, giving him a total of three life sentences.

The case led to the passage of the Junny Rios-Martinez, Jr., Act of 1992, which prohibited those convicted of sexual battery from receiving early release in the state of Florida.

In prison
Schwab's Florida Department of Corrections prisoner number was 111129. After his sentence, he was housed at Florida State Prison in Starke, Florida.

Stays of execution
On December 15, 2006, Governor Jeb Bush suspended all pending executions until further notice after the execution of Ángel Nieves Díaz had taken much longer than usual. This ban was lifted when the new Governor of Florida, Charlie Crist, signed Schwab's death warrant on July 18, 2007. Schwab was then transferred to Florida State Prison. He was scheduled for execution by means of lethal injection on November 15, 2007, at 6:00 p.m. EST. However, federal judge Anne C. Conway granted a stay of execution on November 14. On November 15, the 11th Circuit Court of Appeals ruled that the execution could proceed, but the United States Supreme Court blocked the execution later that same day pending a Kentucky case that challenged the three-drug combination used for lethal injection in both Florida and Kentucky.

The Supreme Court upheld Kentucky's death penalty on April 16, 2008, by a vote of 7 to 2. Crist signed a new death warrant for Schwab the next day, without a date for execution. On May 19, the Supreme Court specifically denied Schwab's appeal, permitting Crist to reschedule the execution. Schwab's final appeal to the Florida Supreme Court was denied because similar claims had already been declined by the Supreme Court.

Death
Schwab was executed by lethal injection on July 1, 2008, and pronounced dead at 6:15 p.m. He declined to make a last statement.

See also
 Capital punishment in Florida
 Capital punishment in the United States
 List of people executed in Florida
 List of people executed in the United States in 2008

References

External links
Profile of the Mark Dean Schwab case at Florida's Capital Crimes Database (Word document)
Mark D. Schwab vs. State of Florida - Case no. 80,289

1968 births
2008 deaths
1991 murders in the United States
American kidnappers
American prisoners sentenced to death
American rapists
American murderers of children
American people convicted of murder
21st-century executions of American people
People executed for murder
People executed by Florida by lethal injection
People from Brevard County, Florida
21st-century executions by Florida
People convicted of murder by Florida
People from Dover, Ohio
Executed people from Ohio
Violence against men in North America